Paul Birchard is an American actor who lives in Finland. He has appeared in film, television, stage and radio productions, most notably as Bud in Sweet Bird of Youth with the Royal National Theatre, Ross in The Goat, or Who Is Sylvia? at the Traverse Theatre, Edinburgh, and Chuck in the premiere of Frank Grimes's first performed play, The Fishing Trip. Birchard is also known for his one-man stage adaptation of F. Scott Fitzgerald stories, a documentary film about Tennessee Williams and Konrad Hopkins which he produced and directed, and a song promoting the Glasgow Diamonds American football team.

Early life and education 
Birchard grew up in Los Angeles, California, where he saw Henry Fonda acting and directing stage performances, including The Time of Your Life in 1972. He moved to Scotland, and in 1981 graduated with a Diploma in Dramatic Art from the Royal Scottish Academy of Music and Drama in Glasgow.

Career 
During the 1980s, Birchard worked as a DJ at Radio Clyde, and appeared in various stage performances including supporting roles in a touring production of The Entertainer, and pantomime.

In 1986 he wrote and recorded the song "Diamonds Rap (We Are The Diamonds)", promoting the Glasgow Diamonds American football team. CBS Sports created a video package called the "CBS Video Bowl" for the half-time interval of their worldwide broadcast of the Super Bowl in January 1987, and in a countdown from seven to one, "Diamonds Rap (We Are The Diamonds)" beat more polished rap videos by NFL teams to take the top spot.

His career continued to encompass radio and stage roles, as well as appearances on television and in films. In 1991, he appeared at the Warehouse Theatre Croydon, London, in the premiere of Frank Grimes' first performed play, The Fishing Trip. Reviewers commented, "Paul Birchard's macho Vietnam vet Chuck is unexpectedly subtle"; "the riven Pat is set against the brooding force of Paul Birchard's Chuck - who conveys menace with the minimum of histrionics."

In 1994, he adapted five of F. Scott Fitzgerald's Pat Hobby Stories into a one-man show at the Riverside Studios, London, in which he "used his broad acting talent to impersonate characters like the brash producer to the effeminate hairdresser ... The American actor's storytelling ability is so vivid that the very few props he uses - telephones, typewriters and Time magazines - are hardly needed to boost the imagination." A reviewer in The Times considered that the stories were "not F. Scott Fitzgerald at his best ... frankly, five is a handful too many. ... The fault does not really lie with Birchard's performance ... he plays numerous parts adeptly, flicking from Hobby's wannabe Sam-Spade suavity to a cute-talking broad. He conveys character simply, with a jutting jaw or a seductive finger." Two years later, he took the show to the Dublin Fringe Theatre Festival, and in 2019, performed it at the Edinburgh Fringe Festival.

Some of his most notable roles have been at the National Theatre. He also played Benjamin's father in the London run of The Graduate. Birchard's more recent roles have been in Inherit the Wind at the Old Vic in London, where he played the town mayor and was understudy to Kevin Spacey. In Edward Albee's The Goat, or Who Is Sylvia? at the Traverse Theatre, Edinburgh, Birchard played Ross. The Guardian reviewer said, "Superb performances from Sian Thomas, John Ramm, Paul Birchard and Kyle McPhail do tremendous justice to an unnerving play", while The Stage wrote "the four-strong cast put in near definitive performances ... Paul Birchard is lugubrious longest-serving friend, Ross ... Ross’s gleeful delight in the idea of an affair is a superbly-judged precursor to his horror at the enormity of the reality."

On radio, he has been a regular guest on the Eddie Mair Live show on Radio Scotland in the early 1990s, and appeared in BBC Radio 4 plays and readings in the 1990s and 2000s. He also provided the voice over for 1998 computer game Plane Crazy, as well as the voice of one of the main characters in Crysis 2 in 2011.

On television, he appeared in a number of BBC 2 plays, including a drama about Buddy Holly in 1989, presented the World League of American Football on Scottish TV, and appeared in Spooks as a rogue CIA operative.

Birchard produced, directed and appeared in the feature-length documentary film U & Me & Tennessee: An American Romance..., which deals with a romance by correspondence between playwright Tennessee Williams and Konrad Hopkins. This film was an official selection at the 2007 Raindance Film Festival and at the Sydney Mardi Gras Film Festival.

Selected stage performances

Filmography

Film
1985: King Solomon's Mines – German on Train (uncredited)
1989: Batman – Another Reporter
1990: Memphis Belle – Lieutenant
1992: La mansión de los Cthulhu – Billy
1998: Sista Kontraktet (The Last Contract) – Bertram Norris
1999: Gregory's Two Girls – American Executive
2001: The Tailor of Panama – Joe
2001: The Fourth Angel – Pilot
2001: Revelation – General Demolay
2003: Quicksand – F.B.I. Man
2003: Solid Air – Chris
2003: The Jacket – Doctor
2005: The White Countess – Company Director
2006: Alien Autopsy – Senior TV Exec
2007: 1408 – Mr. Innkeeper
2008: The Dark Knight – Cop with Fat Thug
2011: Hanna – Bob
2012: Outpost: Black Sun – Cains
2012: The Angels' Share – North American Bidder
2012: Love Bite – Reverend Lynch
2016: Fantastic Beasts and Where to Find Them – Hobo
2019: Les Temps De Marguerite – Ernest Hemingway

TV

Radio

Personal life 
Birchard is a lifelong devotee of Meher Baba. He has four children, including Ross Matthew Birchard, who produces music as Hudson Mohawke.

References

External links

'Diamond Rap' on YouTube
 Actor's website

American male film actors
American male stage actors
American male television actors
Year of birth missing (living people)
Living people
American expatriates in the United Kingdom
Place of birth missing (living people)
Followers of Meher Baba